Küzdelem a létért is a 1918 Hungarian drama film directed by Alfréd Deésy. It is based on French writer Alphonse Daudet's 1889 play La lutte pour la vie. The film was advertised and discussed in Hungarian trade publications as A Leopard.

Cast
Cast adapted from book Lugosi.

Production
Bela Lugosi was billed as Arisztid Olt in the film and it was his final film for Star Studios. The film is one of the few Hungarian films featuring actor Bela Lugosi known to exist in 2021. Only a fragment of the film is available.

Release
Küzdelem a létért was previewed on July 16, 1918 at the Mozgókép-Otthon in Budapest, before being released on September 22, 1918.

See also
 Béla Lugosi filmography

References

Sources

External links

1918 films
Hungarian black-and-white films
Hungarian silent films
Hungarian drama films
Films based on works by Alphonse Daudet
Films directed by Alfréd Deésy
Austro-Hungarian films